The New Jersey Libertarian Party (NJLP) is the affiliate of the Libertarian Party in New Jersey. Its chairman is Dan Krause.

As of July 1, 2020, there were 17,298 registered Libertarians in the state.

Candidate performances

Presidential

Gubernatorial

References

External links
 Official website

New Jersey
Libertarian Party